Sigtuna IF is a sports club located in Sigtuna on the outskirts of Stockholm, Sweden. Sigtuna, mostly known for being the oldest town in Sweden is also known for sports.

The club has a floorball team as well as football and table tennis.

See also
Football in Sweden
List of football clubs in Sweden

References 

Sports teams in Sweden
Sigtuna Municipality